The following is a list of rivers in the Wellington Region. The list is arranged in arranged by the location of the river mouth clockwise around the bottom of the North Island. Tributaries are indented under their downstream parent's name and arranged by nearest to the source.

 Mataikona River
 Pakowhai River
 Whareama River
 Tinui River
 Kaiwhata River
 Pahaoa River
 Wainuioru River
 Whakatahine River
 Rerewhakaaitu River
 Oterei River
 Awhea River
 Opouawe River
 Cape River
 Castle River
 Whawanui River
 Ruamahanga River
 Kopuaranga River
 Waipoua River
 Whangaehu River
 Waingawa River
 Tauweru River
 Waiohine River
 Park River
 Hector River
 Mangatarere Stream
 Huangarua River
 Mākara River
 Ruakokoputuna River
 Dry River (New Zealand)
 Tauherenikau River
 Waiorongomai River (Wellington)
 Turanganui River (Wellington)
 Wharepapa River
 Ōrongorongo River
 Wainuiomata River
 Te Awa Kairangi / Hutt River
 Eastern Hutt River
 Western Hutt River
 Pākuratahi River
 Mangaroa River
 Akatarawa River
 Little Akatarawa River
 Whakatīkei River
 Kaiwharawhara Stream
 Korimako Stream
 Wharemauku Stream
 Waikanae River
 Ngatiawa River
 Rangiora River
 Reikorangi Stream
 Maungakotukutuku Stream,
 Ōtaki River
 Waitewaewae River
 Waiotauru River
 Eastern Waiotauru River
 Southern Waiotauru River

Wellington